{{DISPLAYTITLE:C6H15O4P}}
The molecular formula C6H15O4P (molar mass: 182.15 g/mol, exact mass: 182.0708 u) may refer to:

 Diisopropylphosphate
 Triethyl phosphate